Sarah Ruth Lacy (born December 29, 1975) is an American technology journalist and author.

Early life
Lacy received her B.A. in literature from Rhodes College.

Career
Lacy is the former co-host of web video show Yahoo! Tech Ticker and was a columnist at BusinessWeek.

Lacy was a columnist at TechCrunch until November 19, 2011.

She is the author of 3 books: Once You're Lucky, Twice You're Good (2008), which also goes under the title The Stories of Facebook, Youtube and Myspace; Brilliant, Crazy, Cocky: How the Top 1% of Entrepreneurs Profit from Global Chaos (2011); and A Uterus Is A Feature, Not A Bug (2017).

PandoDaily
In 2012, Lacy founded technology news site PandoDaily with a reported $2.5m investment from investors including Marc Andreessen, Peter Thiel, Tony Hsieh, David Sze, Jim Breyer, Reid Hoffman, Chris Dixon and Josh Kopelman. The site consisted of a daily technology blog and a monthly event series entitled "PandoMonthly".

A series of emails from 2012 indicated Lacy was involved in a dispute regarding an event PandoDaily hosted in 2012 at event space Cross Campus in Los Angeles.

On November 17, 2014, then-Uber executive Emil Michael allegedly said Uber should consider hiring a team of opposition researchers to dig up dirt on critics in the media including Lacy, and suggested a $1 million smear campaign, after PandoDaily featured a story criticizing the misogynist practices and culture of Uber.

On October 23, 2019, Lacy sold PandoDaily to BuySellAds. Lacy cites the history of harassment, threats, and betrayals she saw and experienced in the Silicon Valley area as the reason for her exit.

Chairman Mom
Lacy co-founded Chairman Mom in May 2017, with the site's stated goals being to aid working mothers solve the toughest problems they face. The service is subscription based at $5/month.

Recognition 
In 2012, Forbes named Lacy one of the top 20 most influential businesswomen in the world.

References

External links

Personal site

American technology journalists
1975 births
Living people
Writers from Tennessee
American columnists
21st-century American non-fiction writers
21st-century American women writers
American technology writers
Rhodes College alumni
American bloggers
American women bloggers
Women technology writers
American women columnists